Urgush (Urğış) is a rural locality (a selo) and the administrative centre of Urgushevsky Selsoviet, Karaidelsky District, Bashkortostan, Russia. The population was 704 as of 2010. There are 13 streets.

Geography 
Urgush is located 27 km southwest of Karaidel (the district's administrative centre) by road. Razdolye and Zuyevka are the nearest rural localities.

References 

Rural localities in Karaidelsky District